Dzerzhinskoye is a rural locality (a selo) in Khasavyurtovsky District, Republic of Dagestan, Russia. The population was 2,071 as of 2010. There are 42 streets.

Geography 
Dzerzhinskoye is located 39 km north of Khasavyurt (the district's administrative centre) by road. Utsmiyurt is the nearest rural locality.

References 

Rural localities in Khasavyurtovsky District